Komagaku (高麗楽) is a form of Gagaku (traditional Japanese court music) form arranged in the Heian period mainly based on Koguryeo music and sankangaku (the music of the Three Kingdoms of Korea and is often played as a dance accompaniment.
In contrast to other forms of Gagaku, Komagaku uses no plucked string instruments, only winds and percussion.

References

Gagaku